Giganthias is a small genus of marine ray-finned fish belonging to the Anthiinae subfamily, which is part of the family Serranidae. the groupers and sea basses. It contains two species from Japan, Taiwan, and Indonesia.

Taxonomy
Giganthias was first established by Japanese ichthyologist Masao Katayama in 1954 based on two specimens of the type species Giganthias immaculatus recovered from the island of Izu Ōshima in Japan. Katayama initially placed the species in a separate subfamily, Giganthiinae, but it is now accepted to be under the subfamily Anthiadinae of the family Serranidae.

In 2012, a new species of Giganthias was described from Lombok, Indonesia, based on a specimen recovered from a fish market in the village of Tanjung Luar.

Description
Giganthias are characterized by nine spines on the dorsal fin. The third dorsal spine and the pelvic spines have serrated tips. The lateral line is very highly arched and a supplementary maxillary is present.

Species
Giganthias contains two species:
Giganthias immaculatus Katayama, 1954
Giganthias serratospinosus White & Dharmadi, 2012 - Spinyfin perch

References

Anthiinae
Taxa named by Masao Katayama
Marine fish genera